Seamus Heath (born 6 December 1961) is a Northern Irish former association football midfielder and coach who was most recently manager of Welsh Premier League club Aberystwyth Town. 

Heath was an archetypal journeyman appearing for several clubs during the course of his career. He subsequently carved out a successful career in coaching.

Playing career
Heath began his career at amateur club Cromac Albion where for a time he roomed with future Northern Ireland international Mal Donaghy. In April 1979 he joined Football League side Luton Town although Heath did not make any league appearances for the club and in April 1982 joined Lincoln City on loan. He spent the 1983–84 season at Wrexham and then played for Tranmere Rovers before returning to Northern Ireland with Portadown in October 1986.

Soon afterwards Heath moved to Finland to play for Bollklubben-46 and subsequently played for a number of other clubs in the country. In October 1989 he joined Glentoran although the following summer Heath returned to Bollklubben-46. He rejoined Glentoran in October 1990. Heath signed for Distillery in July 1992. He moved to League of Ireland side Derry City in August 1994. He returned to the Irish Football League with Cliftonville in August 1995.

Coaching
Heath served as youth development officer at Glenavon and until 2005 combined this with a wider role as one of 23 Irish Football Association (IFA) youth development officers. In this capacity he also served as assistant manager of the Northern Ireland under-19 team. In January 2006 Heath was appointed manager of Kilmore Recreation.

Heath would return to the IFA around 2007 as a "Grassroots Development Officer" for the Down district. As of 2011 Heath remains in position with the IFA. He has also turned out for the Northern Ireland over 45s in veterans matches.

On 28 March 2018, Heath was announced as manager of Welsh club Aberystwyth Town due to former manager Neville Powell's pro licence expiring.

Family
His son Ben subsequently played for [[Gap Connah's Quay F.C and his niece Alex Heath is a Camogie player and a former Champion Irish dancer

References

1961 births
Living people
Association footballers from Northern Ireland
English Football League players
Luton Town F.C. players
Lincoln City F.C. players
Wrexham A.F.C. players
Tranmere Rovers F.C. players
NIFL Premiership players
Portadown F.C. players
Veikkausliiga players
Glentoran F.C. players
Lisburn Distillery F.C. players
League of Ireland players
Derry City F.C. players
Cliftonville F.C. players
Expatriate association footballers from Northern Ireland
Football managers from Northern Ireland
Association footballers from Belfast
Aberystwyth Town F.C. managers
Cymru Premier managers
Association football midfielders
Bollklubben-46 players